Fábio Camilo de Brito, nicknamed "Nenê", (born 6 June 1975 in São Paulo, Brazil), is a Brazilian former professional footballer who played as a central defender.

Club statistics

Honours
Hertha BSC
 DFB-Ligapokal: 2003

Vitória
 Campeonato Baiano: 2004, 2005

Urawa Reds
 J. League: 2006
 Emperor's Cup: 2006
 AFC Champions League: 2007

References

External links
 
 

1975 births
Living people
Brazilian footballers
Association football defenders
Urawa Red Diamonds players
Clube Atlético Juventus players
Guarani FC players
Sporting CP footballers
Grêmio Foot-Ball Porto Alegrense players
Esporte Clube Vitória players
Esporte Clube Bahia players
Coritiba Foot Ball Club players
Hertha BSC players
Campeonato Brasileiro Série A players
Primeira Liga players
Bundesliga players
J1 League players
Brazilian expatriate footballers
Brazilian expatriate sportspeople in Japan
Expatriate footballers in Japan
Brazilian expatriate sportspeople in Germany
Expatriate footballers in Germany
Brazilian expatriate sportspeople in Portugal
Expatriate footballers in Portugal
Footballers from São Paulo